Harveys Lake Tahoe is a hotel and casino located in Stateline, Nevada. It also has a video arcade, wedding chapel, pool, convention center and a full-service health club. It is owned by Vici Properties and operated by Caesars Entertainment.

History
Harvey's was originally opened in 1944 and operated by Sacramento meat wholesaler Harvey Gross and his wife Llewellyn. They opened the first high rise tower and an 11-story, 197-room hotel in Nevada just across the state line from Lake Tahoe, California in 1963.

The hotel suffered an explosion from a 1,000-pound bomb on August 27, 1980, that left a crater three stories deep when it was detonated by the FBI. (The area around the hotel had been cleared and no one was injured.) The bomb was placed by John Birges, a heavily in-debt Fresno landscaper who had lost at least $1 million at casinos in Stateline and was hoping to extort $3 million from the bomb threat. He was convicted and sentenced to life in prison without the possibility of parole, where he died from liver cancer in 1996.

In 1983, Harvey Gross died at the age of 78; however, the company continued to operate under family management. In 1985, Harveys sold Harvey's Inn, northeast of Stateline, which reopened as the Lakeside Inn. The 18-story, $74 million, glass "Lake Tower" opened in 1986, the same year the trademark "Wagon Wheel" was replaced on the 11-story tower with the current Harveys brand.

In early 1992, Harveys entered a bidding war with Hilton Hotels Corporation over the right to buy Bally's Reno, which opened on May 3, 1978, as MGM Grand Reno (now Grand Sierra Resort). Harveys announced an agreement on a $71 million deal, only to see Hilton up the ante to $73 million and assumption of Bally's debt. Several weeks later, after considering even higher bids, a federal bankruptcy court settled the matter by approving Hilton's final $83 million offer.

After going public on February 15, 1994, Harveys began new projects including a joint venture with Hard Rock America for an $80 million casino in Las Vegas, which it later sold its interest in 1997 and then a casino resort in Central City, Colorado. A riverboat casino-convention center in Council Bluffs, Iowa, followed in early 1996.

In the late 1990s, Bill Cosby was signed on as the spokesman for Harveys.  This included putting the actor's likeness on several of the casino chips and recording several specials at the casino.

In 1999, Colony Capital bought a controlling interest in Harveys Casino Resorts. Harveys announced on April 24, 2001, that it would be acquired by Harrah's Entertainment (later Caesars Entertainment) for $625 million.

On October 6, 2017, ownership of the property was transferred to Vici Properties as part of a corporate spin-off, and it was leased back to Caesars Entertainment.

References

External links
 
 

1944 establishments in Nevada
Caesars Entertainment
Casino hotels
Casinos in Stateline, Nevada
Hotel buildings completed in 1944
Hotel buildings completed in 1963
Hotel buildings completed in 1986
Hotels established in 1944
Hotels established in 1963
Hotels established in 1986
Hotels in Stateline, Nevada
Resorts in Nevada
Skyscraper hotels in Nevada